The 29th parallel south is a circle of latitude that is 29 degrees south of the Earth's equatorial plane. It crosses the Atlantic Ocean, Africa, the Indian Ocean, Australasia, the Pacific Ocean and South America.

In Australia, much of the border between Queensland and New South Wales is defined by the parallel.

Around the world
Starting at the Prime Meridian and heading eastwards, the parallel 29° south passes through:

{| class="wikitable plainrowheaders"
! scope="col" width="125" | Co-ordinates
! scope="col" | Country, territory or ocean
! scope="col" | Notes
|-
| style="background:#b0e0e6;" | 
! scope="row" style="background:#b0e0e6;" | Atlantic Ocean
| style="background:#b0e0e6;" |
|-valign="top"
| 
! scope="row" | 
| Northern Cape Free State
|-
| 
! scope="row" | 
|
|-
| 
! scope="row" | 
| KwaZulu Natal
|-
| style="background:#b0e0e6;" | 
! scope="row" style="background:#b0e0e6;" | Indian Ocean
| style="background:#b0e0e6;" | 
|-valign="top"
| 
! scope="row" | 
| Western Australia South Australia Queensland / New South Wales border — note that the border occasionally diverts slightly north and south of the parallel New South Wales Queensland New South Wales
|-
| style="background:#b0e0e6;" | 
! scope="row" style="background:#b0e0e6;" | Pacific Ocean
| style="background:#b0e0e6;" |
|-
| 
! scope="row" | 
|
|-
| style="background:#b0e0e6;" | 
! scope="row" style="background:#b0e0e6;" | Pacific Ocean
| style="background:#b0e0e6;" | Passing just north of Raoul Island, 
|-
| 
! scope="row" | 
|
|-
| 
! scope="row" | 
|
|-valign="top"
| 
! scope="row" | 
| Rio Grande do Sul Santa Catarina
|-
| style="background:#b0e0e6;" | 
! scope="row" style="background:#b0e0e6;" | Atlantic Ocean
| style="background:#b0e0e6;" | 
|}

See also
28th parallel south
30th parallel south

s29
Borders of Queensland
Borders of New South Wales